This is a list of endorsements for declared candidates for the Democratic primaries for the 2016 United States presidential election.

Hillary Clinton (won primary)

Bernie Sanders (withdrawn)

Rocky De La Fuente (withdrawn)

Martin O'Malley (withdrawn)

Lawrence Lessig (withdrawn)

Jim Webb (withdrawn)

References

Democratic Party primaries
2016 United States Democratic presidential primaries